Cannonball's Sharpshooters is the seventh album by jazz saxophonist Cannonball Adderley, and his second released on the EmArcy label, featuring performances with Nat Adderley, Junior Mance, Sam Jones, and Jimmy Cobb.

Reception
The Allmusic review by Scott Yanow awarded the album 4 stars and states "Excellent bebop comes from the great altoist Cannonball Adderley and his original quintet".

Track listing 
 "Our Delight" (Tadd Dameron) - 4:38     
 "What's New?" (Johnny Burke, Bob Haggart) - 5:02
 "Fuller Bop Man" (Gil Fuller) - 3:43     
 "Jubilation" (Julian "Cannonball" Adderley) - 5:25     
 "Stay on It" (Dameron) - 4:38 
 "If I Love Again" (Oscar Hammerstein II, Richard Rodgers) - 5:27     
 "Straight, No Chaser" (Thelonious Monk) - 8:26     
 "Fuller Bop Man" [alternate take] (Gil Fuller) - 8:59 Bonus track on CD reissue     
 Recorded at Bell Sound Studios in New York City on March 4 (tracks 1–3, 7–8) and March 6 (tracks 4–6), 1958

Personnel 
 Cannonball Adderley - alto saxophone
 Nat Adderley – cornet 
 Junior Mance - piano
 Sam Jones - bass
 Jimmy Cobb - drums

References 

1958 albums
EmArcy Records albums
Cannonball Adderley albums